Psalm 95 is the 95th psalm of the Book of Psalms, beginning in English in the King James Version: "O come, let us sing unto the LORD: let us make a joyful noise to the rock of our salvation". The Book of Psalms starts the third section of the Hebrew Bible, and, as such, is a book of the Christian Old Testament. In the slightly different numbering system in the Greek Septuagint version of the Bible, and in the Latin Vulgate, this psalm is Psalm 94. In Latin, it is known as "Venite exultemus". The psalm is a hymn psalm, one of the Royal psalms, praising God as the King of His people. Psalm 95 identifies no author, but Hebrews 4:7 attributes it to David. The Vulgate also names David as the author.

The psalm forms a regular part of Jewish, Catholic, Lutheran, Anglican and other Protestant liturgies, in particular as a responsorial psalm.

Text

King James Version 
 O come, let us sing unto the LORD: let us make a joyful noise to the rock of our salvation.
 Let us come before his presence with thanksgiving, and make a joyful noise unto him with psalms.
 For the LORD is a great God, and a great King above all gods.
 In his hand are the deep places of the earth: the strength of the hills is his also.
 The sea is his, and he made it: and his hands formed the dry land.
 O come, let us worship and bow down: let us kneel before the LORD our maker.
 For he is our God; and we are the people of his pasture, and the sheep of his hand. To day if ye will hear his voice,
 Harden not your heart, as in the provocation, and as in the day of temptation in the wilderness:
 When your fathers tempted me, proved me, and saw my work.
 Forty years long was I grieved with this generation, and said, It is a people that do err in their heart, and they have not known my ways:
 Unto whom I sware in my wrath that they should not enter into my rest.

Uses

Judaism 
Psalm 95 is the opening paragraph of Kabbalat Shabbat in Ashkenazic, Hasidic and some Sephardic communities. It is recited in some communities on Shabbat Hagadol. The first three verses are recited in most communities at the end of the psalm of the day for the Shir Shel Yom on Wednesday, which is primarily the previous psalm: this is the only day of the week in which the song of the day is composed on verses from multiple psalms, and the addition of these verses seems to be relatively late. These verses are recited by most congregations because of their inspiring message.

New Testament 
Verses 7-11 of Psalm 95 are quoted in Hebrews ; Hebrews , 7.

Christianity 
In the Latin Psalters used by the Roman liturgy, the psalm forms the invitatory which is sung daily before matins. It may be sung as a canticle in the Anglican and Lutheran liturgy of Morning Prayer, when it is referred to by its incipit as the Venite or "Venite exultemus Domino", sometimes also A Song of Triumph.

Music
Jean-Joseph Cassanéa de Mondonville set one grand motet "Venite, exultemus" (before 1740).

References

External links 

 
 
 Text of Psalm 95 according to the 1928 Psalter
 Psalms Chapter 95 text in Hebrew and English, mechon-mamre.org
 Come, let us sing joyfully to the LORD; cry out to the rock of our salvation. text and footnotes, usccb.org United States Conference of Catholic Bishops
 Psalm 95:1 introduction and text, biblestudytools.com
 Psalm 95 – God Worthy of Our Humble and Obedient Worship enduringword.com
 Psalm 95 / Refrain: Come, let us worship and bow down. Church of England
 Psalm 95 at biblegateway.com
 Hymns for Psalm 95 hymnary.org
Recordings of the first verse of the psalm, as sung during Kabbalat Shabbat.

095
Works attributed to David